Charles Edwards (18 October 1884 – 22 May 1938) was an English cricketer. He played for Gloucestershire between 1911 and 1912.

References

1884 births
1938 deaths
English cricketers
Gloucestershire cricketers
People from Port Elizabeth